"There There" is a song by the English rock band Radiohead. It was released as the lead single from their sixth album, Hail to the Thief (2003), on 26 May 2003. It reached number four on the UK Singles Chart, number one in Canada and Portugal, and number 14 on the US Billboard Modern Rock Tracks chart. The song appears on Radiohead: The Best Of (2008).

Recording
Radiohead performed an early version of "There There" on a webcast during the sessions for their 2000 album Kid A, before recording it for Hail to the Thief with their longtime producer Nigel Godrich. They recorded a version at Ocean Way in Los Angeles in 2002, but were not satisfied with the results. According to the guitarist Jonny Greenwood, "Sometimes it doesn't work at all, because you haven't got the real volume of a live concert ... That just doesn't really work coming out of speakers in your front room ... It just sounded a bit like we were trying to make a worthy 'live band playing together' recording."

The singer, Thom Yorke, feared the song may be lost, but Radiohead returned to the UK and recorded an alternative version in their Oxfordshire studio. Yorke said he cried with relief when he heard Godrich's mix, saying he had dreamed of how he wanted the song to sound: "And one day you walk into the studio and there it is. But you've not been standing there with a hammer and trying to beat it out of the desk or your guitar, it's not necessary. It's just there one day." A demo was released as the B-side to Radiohead's 2003 single "2 + 2 = 5".

Composition
"There There" is a rock song with layered percussion that builds to a loud climax. It was influenced by Can, Siouxsie and the Banshees and the Pixies.NME Magazine, 10 May 2003 Yorke said it was "supposed to be comforting – 'It's alright, you're just imagining it.'" The subtitle "The Boney King of Nowhere" refers to a song from the animated series Bagpuss, which Yorke watched with his young son.

Music video
Yorke asked Oliver Postgate, the creator of Bagpuss,'' to create the music video for "There There", but Postgate declined as he was retired. Instead, a stop-motion-animated video was created by Chris Hopewell. Yorke instructed him to make a video similar to the folk tales of the Brothers Grimm and the Czech animator Jan Švankmajer. Hopewell described it as "fifties East European genre animation, overlaboured and naive". The video debuted on the Times Square Jumbotron in New York on 20 May 2003, and received hourly play that day on MTV2.

In the video, Yorke enters a forest and walks around a town consisting entirely of animals. He sees numerous events play out, such as a wedding, and finds a golden jacket and a pair of golden shoes. He puts them on, awakening a group of crows, who chase and attack him. The shoes give Yorke super speed, but the effect wears off when the crows fly away and his feet become tangled in ivy. He breaks free, but the shoes fall off. His feet become tree roots, and Yorke becomes a tree. The crows rest on the branches.

Reception 
"There There" reached number four in the UK Singles Chart and number one in Canada. It also received moderate airplay from US modern rock stations, peaking at number fourteen on the Hot Modern Rock Tracks chart, and was nominated for a Grammy Award for Best Rock Performance by a Duo or Group with Vocal. The music video won the MTV Video Music Award for Best Art Direction at the 2003 MTV Video Awards.

Track listings
Standard CD and 12-inch single
 "There There" – 5:23
 "Paperbag Writer" – 3:58
 "Where Bluebirds Fly" – 4:32

Personnel

Radiohead
Thom Yorke
Jonny Greenwood
Colin Greenwood
Ed O'Brien
Philip Selway

Additional personnel
Nigel Godrich – production
Darrell Thorp – engineering
Stanley Donwood – artwork

Release

Charts

Weekly charts

Year-end charts

References

External links

At Ease Web song info entry
At Ease Web Discography entry

2003 singles
Canadian Singles Chart number-one singles
Environmental songs
Music videos directed by Chris Hopewell
Number-one singles in Portugal
Parlophone singles
Radiohead songs
Song recordings produced by Nigel Godrich
Songs written by Colin Greenwood
Songs written by Ed O'Brien
Songs written by Jonny Greenwood
Songs written by Philip Selway
Songs written by Thom Yorke
Stop-motion animated music videos